Herbert Cook (1888 – after 1919) was an English footballer who played a handful of games in the Football League for Sheffield United. He also had spells at a number of other local teams including Doncaster Rovers and Chesterfield.

Career
Cook signed for Sheffield United in 1908 but failed to make a first team appearance until 1910.  He was a part-time player who worked at local firm Mappin & Webb and turned down the offer of a full-time contract from the club.  Instead he moved to Doncaster Rovers on part-time terms, following which he moved on to a number of local clubs. Cook did return to play for the Blades on a couple of occasions as a guest player during World War I, as well as some appearances for Watford during the same period, before joining the Royal Flying Corps for the remainder of the war.

References

1880s births
Year of death missing
Footballers from Sheffield
English footballers
Association football outside forwards
Worksop Town F.C. players
Thorpe Hesley F.C. players
Sheffield United F.C. players
Doncaster Rovers F.C. players
Chesterfield F.C. players
Mexborough Athletic F.C. players
Halifax Town A.F.C. players
English Football League players
Midland Football League players
Watford F.C. wartime guest players
Royal Flying Corps soldiers